The second series of Spirited, an Australian drama television series, aired on 20 July 2011. The season concluded after 10 episodes.

Spirited follows dentist Suzy Darling (Claudia Karvan), who walks away from a loveless marriage and into an old apartment block that is inhabited by the ghost of a 1980s English rock star Henry Mallet (Matt King). Suzy had been married to husband Steve Darling (Rodger Corser) for 15 years and they have two children son Elvis (Louis Fowler), 13, and daughter Verity (Charlie Hancock), 8. Belinda Bromilow also stars as Suzy's sister Jonquil.

Cast

Regular
 Claudia Karvan as Suzy Darling
 Matt King as Henry Mallet
 Rodger Corser as Steve Darling
 Belinda Bromilow as Jonquil Payne
 Angus Sampson as Zac Hannigan
Louis Fowler as Elvis Darling
Charlie Hancock as Verity Darling
Simon Lyndon as Darren Bonney

Episodes

{| class="wikitable plainrowheaders" style="width:100%;"
|- style="color:black"
! style="background: #FF5F6C;" | No. inseries
! style="background: #FF5F6C;" | No. inseason
! style="background: #FF5F6C;" | Title
! style="background: #FF5F6C;" | Directed by
! style="background: #FF5F6C;" | Written by
! style="background: #FF5F6C;" | Original air date
|-

|}

References

2011 Australian television seasons